TIB (or Tib or TiB) may refer to:

In computing:
Tebibit (Tib), a unit of information used to quantify computer memory or storage capacity
Tebibyte (TiB), a unit of information used to quantify computer memory or storage capacity
TIB (file format), a file format used by Acronis True Image software
Win32 Thread Information Block, in Microsoft Windows programming

Companies and organizations:
 :nl:Toetsingscommissie Inzet Bevoegdheden, the Dutch review board for the use of special powers by the security and intelligence services
 Danish Timber Industry and Construction Workers' Union (native name Forbundet Træ-Industri-Byg i Danmark)
 Technische Informationsbibliothek, the German National Library of Science and Technology
 Transparency International Bangladesh, an anti-corruption non-governmental organization
 TIB Financial Corporation, a bank holding company purchased by North American Financial Holdings

Characters:
 Tib from "Tib et Tatoum" (aka "Tib and Tumtum") comics/cartoon
 Tib-cat from The Little Broomstick

Other uses:
 River Tib, an underground river flowing through Greater Manchester
 Tib, Iran, a village in Markazi Province, Iran
 The Illustrated Bartsch, a compendium of European master prints
 Therapy Interfering Behavior, in cognitive therapy
 Transscandinavian Igneous Belt